Valiabad (also Romanized as Valīābād; also known as Valīābād-e Beheshtī and Vallad-e Beheshtī) is a village in Azimiyeh Rural District, in the Central District of Ray County, Tehran Province, Iran. At the 2006 census, its population was 3,252, in 918 families.

References 

Populated places in Ray County, Iran